Berliner-Kindl-Schultheiss-Brauerei GmbH is a brewery in Berlin, Germany, that produces Berliner Pilsner, Berliner Kindl, Schultheiss, and Berliner Bürgerbräu. Until 2004, it was part of the larger brewing company Brau & Brunnen, which was then purchased by Dr. August Oetker KG and integrated into the Radeberger Gruppe.

The firm traces its origins to the founding of Schultheiss in Berlin in 1842.

In 2017, the brewery produced  of beer.

References

External links
 

Breweries in Germany
Food and drink companies based in Berlin
Manufacturing companies based in Berlin
Dr. Oetker
German companies established in 1842
Food and drink companies established in 1842